The South Africa national cricket team visited India in 2004 for a 2-match test series. India won the test series with 1-0. Indian cricketer Virender Sehwag scored 262 run in two test and becomes player of the series. Harbhajan Singh took highest number of wicket 13.

Squads

Tests

1st Test

2nd Test

Statistics

Batting
Most runs

Bowling
Most wickets

References

International cricket competitions in 2004–05
2004 in Indian cricket
2004 in South African cricket
2004-05
Indian cricket seasons from 2000–01